"Switchback" is a single by Music for Pleasure and was released in 1982.

Track listing
All songs written and composed by Mark Copson, Christopher Oldroyd, Ivor Roberts and David Whitaker.

Polydor 7" Single: POSP 464

Personnel
 Mark Copson - vocals
 Christopher Oldroyd - drums and percussion
 Ivor Roberts - bass guitar
 David Whitaker - keyboards and synthesizer

Production
 Mike Hedges/Music for Pleasure - producer

References

1982 songs
Music for Pleasure (band) songs
Polydor Records singles
Song recordings produced by Mike Hedges